Leigh Adrian Harline (March 26, 1907 – December 10, 1969) was an American film composer and songwriter.  He was known for his "musical sophistication that was uniquely 'Harline-esque' by weaving rich tapestries of mood-setting underscores and penning memorable melodies for animated shorts and features."

Biography
Leigh Harline was born March 26, 1907, in Salt Lake City, Utah, the youngest of 13 children, to soldier Carl Härlin and his wife Johanna Matilda. His parents came from the village of Härfsta in Simtuna parish, Sweden. They joined the Church of Jesus Christ of Latter-day Saints in 1888 and moved to Salt Lake City, Utah, in 1891. In the U.S., they changed their surname to Harline.  Leigh was baptized a member of the LDS Church at age eight.

Harline graduated from the University of Utah and studied piano and organ with Mormon Tabernacle Choir conductor J. Spencer Cornwall. In 1928, he moved to California and worked at radio stations in San Francisco and Los Angeles as a composer, conductor, arranger, instrumentalist, singer, and announcer. In 1931, he provided music for the first transcontinental radio broadcast to originate from the West Coast. He was then hired by Walt Disney where he scored more than 50 tunes, including for the Silly Symphonies cartoon series in the 1930s.

Harline co-scored and orchestrated music by Frank Churchill and Paul Smith specifically for Disney's first animated feature-length cartoon Snow White and the Seven Dwarfs in 1937.  Snow White contained several classic songs by Churchill and lyricist Larry Morey, including "I'm Wishing", "Whistle While You Work", "Heigh-Ho", and "Some Day My Prince Will Come."

Harline re-teamed with Smith again to compose the score for Pinocchio for Disney in 1940. He also wrote most of the movie's songs with lyricist Ned Washington.  The film won the Academy Award for Best Original Music Score and won both Harline and Washington the Academy Award for Best Original Song for the song "When You Wish Upon a Star". The song went on to be featured on Disney's opening logo since 1985 and serve as the official theme song of the Walt Disney Company.

Harline left Disney in 1941 to compose for other studios. His credits include Mr. Bug Goes to Town (1941) for Disney's chief competitor Max Fleischer as well as Road to Utopia (1945), Mr. Blandings Builds His Dream House (1948), The Desert Rats (1953), The Enemy Below (1957), Ten North Frederick (1958), Warlock (1959), The Wonderful World of the Brothers Grimm (1962), The Travels of Jaimie McPheeters (1963), and 7 Faces of Dr. Lao (1964).

He died from complications of throat cancer on December 10, 1969, in Long Beach, California, and is buried in Valhalla Memorial Park Cemetery.

Selected filmography

The Goddess of Spring (1934)
Snow White and the Seven Dwarfs (1937)
Pinocchio (1940)
Mr. Bug Goes to Town (1941)
Johnny Come Lately (1943)
Road to Utopia (1945)
Crack-Up (1946)
Nocturne (1946)
The Bachelor and the Bobby-Soxer (1947)
The Boy with Green Hair (1948)
Every Girl Should Be Married (1948)
Mr. Blandings Builds His Dream House (1948)
It Happens Every Spring (1949)
The Big Steal (1949)
Monkey Business (1952)
Pickup on South Street (1953)
The Desert Rats (1953)
Broken Lance (1954)
House of Bamboo (1955)
The Last Frontier (1955)
Good Morning, Miss Dove (1955)
23 Paces to Baker Street (1956)
The True Story of Jesse James (1957)
Perry Mason (1957)
The Wayward Bus (1957)
The Enemy Below (1957)
Ten North Frederick (1958)
Man of the West (1958)
The Remarkable Mr. Pennypacker (1959)
Warlock (1959)
Visit to a Small Planet (1960)
The Honeymoon Machine (1961)
The Wonderful World of the Brothers Grimm (1962)
The Travels of Jaimie McPheeters (1963)
7 Faces of Dr. Lao (1963)
Strange Bedfellows (1965)

Sources
A Century of Animation (includes photo)
Disney Legends
LDS Film Composers

References

Soundtrack Magazine, Vol. 8/No. 31 1989 by Ross Care

External links

Finding Aid for Leigh Harline papers, Archives and Rare Books Library, University of Cincinnati, Cincinnati, Ohio

1907 births
1969 deaths
20th-century American composers
American film score composers
Latter Day Saints from Utah
Best Original Music Score Academy Award winners
Best Original Song Academy Award-winning songwriters
Burials at Valhalla Memorial Park Cemetery
Deaths from throat cancer
Deaths from cancer in California
American male film score composers
Musicians from Salt Lake City
Songwriters from Utah
University of Utah alumni
American people of Swedish descent
Animated film score composers
Walt Disney Animation Studios people
20th-century American male musicians